The Oakville Refinery (also known as Petro Canada Oakville Refinery) was a refinery located on the border of Oakville and Burlington in Ontario, Canada.

The refinery was commissioned in 1958 by Cities Service Company. It had an initial capacity . In 1963, the refinery was acquired by BP.  Later it was acquired by Petro-Canada and supplied fuel in Ontario. It closed in 2005, with Petro-Canada (now Suncor Energy) getting supplies for the Ontario market from its Montreal Refinery.

Petro-Canada ascribed the decision to new rules requiring lower sulphur content in gasoline, that would have required an expensive retrofit of the refinery. The relatively small and specialized refinery was also less efficient than the larger ones operated elsewhere. The equipment from the refinery was transported to Pakistan, where it was planned to be re-erected for the Indus Refinery Project. Suncor Energy (formerly Petro-Canada prior to merger in Aug 2009) still operates from the site as a storage terminal.

It was the third refinery to close along Lake Ontario; Shell's Oakville refinery was closed in 1983, and Esso's Mississauga, Ontario refinery located further east on Lakeshore Road closed in 1985.

Following the closing of the plant, the refinery was due to be dismantled and transported to Pakistan, where it would be reassembled for use there. However, this plan fell through due to investors withdrawing support from the project due to political instability in that country with only 65% of the plant transported to Pakistan. The remaining components were sold off in Canada to pay hauliers and other service-providers.

Notes

References
 Petro-Canada to shut refinery, cut 350 jobs
Spears, John. "PetroCan to close refinery." Toronto Star. Toronto, Ont.: Sep 4, 2003. pg. D.01

1958 establishments in Ontario
2005 disestablishments in Ontario
Oil refineries in Canada
Buildings and structures in Oakville, Ontario
Former buildings and structures in Canada